Elite Sports Club is a Cayman Islander football club based in West Bay, which currently plays in Cayman Islands' Premier League.

Achievements
Cayman Islands League: 2
 2008–09, 2010–11
Cayman Islands FA Cup: 2
 2008–09
 2013–14
CIFA Charity Shield: 1
 2009

See also
 caymanactive.com
 soccerway.com
 caribbeanfootballdatabase.com

References

Football clubs in the Cayman Islands
Association football clubs established in 2006
2006 establishments in the Cayman Islands